Algeria–Mexico relations are the diplomatic relations between the People's Democratic Republic of Algeria and the United Mexican States.  Both Algeria and Mexico are members of the Group of 15, Group of 24 and the United Nations.

History 
In 1962, Mexico was the first country to recognize the newly independent Algeria after gaining independence from France. Diplomatic relations between the two nations were formally established on 21 October 1964. In 1965, Mexico's ambassador in Cairo, Egypt was accredited to Algeria. In 1974, a resident embassy of Mexico was opened in Algiers and in 1975, Algeria opened an embassy in Mexico City. In 1975, President Luis Echeverría became the first Mexican head-of-state to visit Algeria. In 1981, Algerian President Chadli Bendjedid paid his first visit to Mexico to attend the North–South Summit in Cancún.

In 2002, Algerian President Abdelaziz Bouteflika paid a visit to the northern Mexican city of Monterrey to attend the Monterrey Consensus. In February 2005, Mexican President Vicente Fox paid an official visit to Algeria and met with Algerian President Abdelaziz Bouteflika. In 2008, as a sign of mutual friendship, a statue of Abdelkader El Djezairi was unveiled in Mexico City. In 2011, a statue dedicated to Emiliano Zapata was unveiled in Algiers. In July 2009, Mexican Foreign Minister Patricia Espinosa paid a visit to Algeria. In April 2015, Mexican Foreign Minister José Antonio Meade also paid a visit to Algeria.

In 2016, the Mexican Chamber of Deputies created the Mexico-Algeria Friendship Group, composed of 11 legislators. The group will be used to promote cooperation in cultural, touristic, technological, educational, commercial and in investments between both countries, as well as increasing multilateral relations. In May 2022, both nations held the Fifth Bilateral Meeting of the Mechanism for Consultations on Matters of Common Interests in Mexico City and attended by Algerian Deputy Foreign Minister Chakib Rachid Kaid.

High-level visits

High-level visits from Algeria to Mexico

 President Chadli Bendjedid (1981 & 1985)
 Foreign Minister Ahmed Taleb Ibrahimi (1985)
 President Abdelaziz Bouteflika (2002)
 Deputy Foreign Minister Chakib Rachid Kaid (2022)

High-level visits from Mexico to Algeria
 Foreign Minister Emilio Óscar Rabasa (1974)
 President Luis Echeverría (1975)
 Foreign Minister Bernardo Sepúlveda Amor (1986)
 President Vicente Fox (2005)
 Foreign Minister Patricia Espinosa (2009)
 Foreign Minister José Antonio Meade (2015)

Bilateral agreements 
Both nations have signed several bilateral agreements such as an Agreement on Cultural Cooperation (1977); Agreement on Cooperation in the Field of Hydrocarbons and their derivatives industry between Pemex and Sonatrach (1984) and an Agreement on establishing an Intergovernmental Commission for Economic, Commercial, Scientific and Technological Cooperation (1985).

Trade relations 
In 2018, two-way trade between both nations amounted to US$178 million. Algeria's main exports to Mexico include; oil, feminine hygiene products, corks and tiles. Mexico's main exports to Algeria include: wheat, garbanzo beans, antibiotics, antivenin, centrifuges and pharmaceutical products. Algeria is Mexico's 67th biggest trading partner (2nd biggest in Africa) while Mexico is Algeria's 38th biggest trading partner, globally. Mexican multinational company Grupo Hermes operates in Algeria.

Resident diplomatic missions 
 Algeria has an embassy in Mexico City.
 Mexico has an embassy in Algiers.

References 

 
Mexico
Bilateral relations of Mexico